Jim Keane (born 1941) is an American politician who served as a Democratic member of the Montana House of Representatives for the 73rd district from 2017 to 2023.

Early life and education 
Keane was born in 1941 in Butte, Montana. He graduated from Butte Central High School and studied at the University of Hawaiʻi, Montana Technological University, Western Montana College, and the University of Wyoming.

Career 
Keane served in the Montana House from 2017 to 2023 and previously served from 2001 to 2007. He is also former member of the Montana Senate and represented the 38th district from 2009 to 2015.

References

External links
Official Legislative Profile

Democratic Party members of the Montana House of Representatives
Democratic Party Montana state senators
Living people
21st-century American politicians
1941 births
Politicians from Butte, Montana